Janty Yates (born 1950) is a British costume designer for film and television. In 2001, she won the Academy Award for Best Costume Design for the 2000 film Gladiator. She has also received nominations for BAFTA awards, Saturn Awards, and Satellite Awards. She is a frequent collaborator with English director Ridley Scott, having worked with him fourteen times .

Career
Janty Yates worked in the fashion industry prior to her career in film and television. Yates' first credited work was in the wardrobe department on the 1981 film Quest for Fire. Her first credited role as a costume designer was for the 1993 British comedy Bad Behaviour, and she worked on a further six films in that role for the rest of the decade.

In 2000, her work on Ridley Scott's Gladiator earned her her first career awards, including the Academy Award for Best Costume Design, and the Las Vegas Film Critics Society award for Best Costume Design, as well as nominations for a BAFTA Award for Best Costume Design and Satellite Award for Best Costume Design. In 2005, she received Best Costume Design nominations from the Costume Designers Guild and Satellite Awards for the 2004 period film De-Lovely. The following year she received her first Goya Award nomination and her third Satellite award nomination for Best Costume Design for Kingdom of Heaven.

In 2006, Yates was one of 120 people invited to join the Academy of Motion Picture Arts and Sciences.

Yates is a frequent collaborator with Scott, having worked on thirteen films with him in addition to Gladiator, including: Hannibal (2001); Kingdom of Heaven (2005); American Gangster (2007); Body of Lies (2008); Robin Hood (2010), for which she received a Saturn Award nomination and her fourth Satellite Award nomination; Prometheus (2012), Exodus: Gods and Kings (2014),  and The Martian (2015). Her most recent films with Scott include the epic historical drama film The Last Duel and the biographical crime drama film House of Gucci'', both released in 2021.

Filmography

Awards and nominations

References

External links
 

Living people
Best Costume Design Academy Award winners
British costume designers
Women costume designers
1950 births